Mala Records was a small record label founded as a Bell Records subsidiary in 1959. Beginning in 1967, albums by Mala recording artists were issued on the Bell label instead of Mala. Along with Bell, Mala was acquired in the late sixties by Columbia Pictures and merged with the co-owned Amy Records into Bell Records.

In 1974, the Mala catalog (and the rest of Bell Records) became part of Arista Records, which was purchased by BMG in 1979, and is now owned by Sony Music.

Mala Records artists
The Birdwatchers
The Box Tops
David Gates
Don and Juan
The Emperors
Jimmy Clanton
Johnny and the Hurricanes
Jumpin' Gene Simmons
Link Wray
Reparata and the Delrons
Ronny and the Daytonas
Spooky Tooth
Little Caesar and the Consuls

See also 
 List of record labels

External links 
 Mala history & discography
 Mala singles discography

Record labels established in 1959
Defunct record labels of the United States